Gabriel Križan (born 10 January 1976) is a Slovak boxer. He competed in the men's bantamweight event at the 1996 Summer Olympics.

References

1976 births
Living people
Slovak male boxers
Olympic boxers of Slovakia
Boxers at the 1996 Summer Olympics
Sportspeople from Bratislava
Bantamweight boxers